The 1985 Porsche Classic was a women's tennis tournament played on indoor hard courts in Filderstadt, West Germany that was part of the 1985 WTA Tour. It was the eighth edition of the tournament and was held from 14 October through 20 October 1985. First-seeded Pam Shriver won the singles title and earned $32,000 first-prize money.

Finals

Singles
 Pam Shriver defeated  Catarina Lindqvist 6–1, 7–5

Doubles
 Hana Mandlíková /  Pam Shriver defeated  Carina Karlsson /  Tine Scheuer-Larsen 6–2, 6–1

References

External links
 
 ITF tournament edition details
 Tournament draws

Porsche Classic
Porsche Tennis Grand Prix
Porsche Classic
Porsche Classic
1980s in Baden-Württemberg
Porsch